This is a timeline of ancient Greece from its emergence around 800 BC to its subjection to the Roman Empire in 146 BC.

For earlier times, see Greek Dark Ages, Aegean civilizations and Mycenaean Greece. For later times see Roman Greece, Byzantine Empire and Ottoman Greece.

For modern Greece after 1820, see Timeline of modern Greek history.

Archaic Period (785–481 BC) 
785 Pithecusae (Ischia) is settled by Euboean Greeks from Eretria and Chalcis
777 Cumae is founded by Chalcis
776 Traditional date for the first historic Olympic games.
757 The First Messenian War starts. (Date disputed by Jerome, Pausanias and Diodorus; this estimate is based on a reading of Diodorus' Spartan king lists and Pausanias' description of the war).
756 Kyzikus is settled by Ionians
754 Polydorus becomes king of Sparta.
753 Athens: Office of Archon reduced to 10 years. Members of the ruling family to possess the office starting with Charops. (Dating based on Pausanias).
743 Rhegion is founded by Euboeans
740 Zancle is founded by Euboeans
738 Alternative date for the end of the First Messenian War.
737 Rhegion and Zancle join in union under Zancle
735 Perdiccas I of Macedon flees from Argos to Macedonia and conquers the land.
734 Polydorus sends colonists to Italy.
734 Syracuse is founded by Korinthians and Teneans
734 Kerkyra is founded by Korinthians
733 Naxos (Sicily) is founded by Euboeans
733 Troliton is founded by Megarans
732 Euboea splits between Chalcis and Eretria due to disputes
731 Sigeion is founded by Mytilene
731 Catania is founded by Chalcidians
730 Leontini is founded by Naxos and controlled by the tyrant Euarchus
730 Troliton is abandoned and settlers settled in Leontini
728 Troliton settlers are ostracized from Leontini and settle Thapsos
727–717 Hippomenes, archon of Athens, kills his daughter's adulterer by yoking him to his chariot and then locks his daughter Leimone in with a horse until she dies. (Pausanias and Aristotle).
c. 725 Lelantine War between Chalcis and Eretria. Many Greek cities are allied with one or the other. Dates before this time uncertain.
725 Thapsos abandoned and Megara Hyblaea is settled by the Thapsos settlers
720s/710s Droughts on Euboea
720 Korinth removes the Liburnians from Kerkyra
720: Sybaris is founded by Achaeans from Helice 
719 Polydorus, King of Sparta, is murdered by Polymarchus.
716 Mylae is founded and annexed by Zancle
716 According to legend: The reign of the Heraklids over Lydia is ended when Candaules, known as Myrsilus to the Greeks, is murdered by Gyges because of his wife's anger.
715 Lydia annexes Colophon and Magnesia and sieges Smyrna
712 Lydia abandons the siege of Smyrna and annexes parts of Troad and Sipylus
712 Korinth annexes Perachora peninsula from Megara
710s Eretrian abandonment of Andros
709 Kroton is founded by Achaeans
707 Taras is founded by Dorians
705 Hybla Minor is annexed by Megara Hyblaea
704 Korinth gives Samos 4 ships
700 The town of Phaselis is founded by the Rhodians
700 Erythra is annexed by Rhegion
699 Metapontion is founded by Kroton and Sybaris
698 Euarchus is overthrown by Leontini
696 Lefkandi is occupied by Chalcis
695 Polieum is founded by Ionians
691 Antandrus is founded and annexed by Mytilene
690 Pheidon becomes tyrant of Argos.
689 Gela is founded by Cretans and Rodians
688 Arisba is annexed by Methymna and Mytilene declares war on Methymna
687 Annual office of Archon established in Athens. Any Athenian citizen can be elected to the office if they have the qualifications. Creon elected first annual archon. (Dating based on Pausanias).
686 Methymna is annexed by Mytilene
686 Megara gains independence from Korinth
685 The second Messenian war begins.
685 Chalcedon is founded by Megarans
680 Epizephyrian Lokros is founded by Opus
676 Pergamon is founded by Ionians
674 Karystus is occupied by Korinth
672 Abydos is settled by Miletus
671 Melia is destroyed by Samos and Priene, Samos builds Fort Carium to replace it and Samos and Priene split Melia
670 Miletus is sieged by Lydia, Priene is annexed by Lydia, Samos annexes former Melian territory
669 or 668 Battle of Hysiae
668 Lydia abandons siege of Mietus
667 Byzantium is founded by Korinthians
665 The second Messenian war ends.
664 Corcyran Revolt and First Sea Battle in ancient Greece between Corcyra and Korinthos
664 Akrai is founded and annexed by Syracuse
657 Cypselus subjects Corinth to tyranny.
657 Founding of Lekas by Corinth
655 Akanthus and Stageira are founded by Androsi
654 Abdera is founded by Klazomenaites
652 Ephesus and Priene are sacked by Cimmerians
651 Levantine War ends, Chalcis wins and annexes Levantine Plain
650 The Pontic Pentapolis: Apollonia, Callatis, Mesembria (Nessebar), Odessos (Varna), and Tomis (Constanța), all on the Euxeinos Pontos.
650 Andros, Kea and Tenos gain independence from Eretria, Cypselus leaves Karystus
650 Syracuse annexes Pantalica
648 Himera is founded by Zancleans
645–560 Spartan wars with Tegea all unsuccessful
643 Kasmenai is founded and annexed by Syracuse
637–630 Drought on Thera
633 Ambrakia founded by Tyrant Gorgus and Korinthians
632 Cylon, Athenian noble, seizes Acropolis and tries unsuccessfully to make himself king
631 Battus establishes a Greek colony in Cyrene in Libya.
630 Helorus is founded and annexed by Syracuse
630 Histria is established by Milesian settlers in order to facilitate trade with the native Getae.
630 Founding of Tripolis by Samos
630 Formal pederasty is introduced, first in Crete, as a means of population control and an educational modality.
628 Selinus is founded by Hyblaea Megarans
627 Epidamos is founded by Kerkyreans
627 Cypselus is succeeded by Periander
625 Establishment of Naucratis
621 Draco, Athenian lawgiver, issues code of laws, with many crimes punishable by death.
621 Epidaurus is annexed by Korinth
619 Herbessus is annexed by Syracuse
616 Miletus is sieged by Lydia
615 Leontini is overthrown by Panaetius
612 Miletus is overthrown by Thrasybulos
610 Panticapaeum (modern city Kerch) is founded by Milesians
609 Panaetius is oust by Leontini
606 Gorgus is succeeded by Periander
604 Lydia abandons the Siege of Miletus
603 Athenai annexes Sigeion
601 Miletus and Korinth become allies
600 Massalia founded by Phocaean Greeks (approximate date).
600 Segesta is Hellenized by Ionians
598 Akrillai is founded and annexed by Syracuse
598 Kamarina is founded and annexed by Syracuse
597 Delphi gains independence from Kirrha
596 Paleopoli is founded by Samosi
595 Salamis is annexed by Athens
595 Start of the First Sacred War
594 Kirrha is sieged by Amphictyonic League
594 Solon, Athenian statesman, becomes Archon pre-582 BC (cf. ML6 and Plutarch Sol. 14)—later, when member of the Areopagus is appointed to effect social reforms in order to preserve order in Athens, which include the abolition of the security of debts on a debtor's person (Aristotle Ath. Pol. 6), returning exiled Athenian slaves (Solon fr. 4 in Ath. Pol. 12), changing the value of weights and measures to the Korinthian standard, prohibiting the export of grain from Attica and encouraging the planting of olives (Plut. Sol. 22-4), established the property classes (Ar. Ath. Pol. 7) and the council of 400 (Ar. Ath. Pol. 8).
592 Ephesus is sieged by Persia
590 Siege of Ephesus is abandoned, Lydia annexes Smyrna and Median-Lydian war starts
590 Muorica (Renamed Modica) is annexed by Syracuse
590 Sappho, Greek poet, flourishes on island of Lesbos.
589 Klazomenai is sieged by Lydia
588 Poseidonia is founded by Sybaris
587 Siege of Klazomenai is abandoned by Lydia
586 Death of Lycophron tyrant of Corcyra
586 Plataea gains independence from Thebai
585 Kirrha is destroyed
585 Lydian-Median border set at Halys River
585 The philosopher Thales of Miletus predicts a solar eclipse that occurs during the Battle of Halys.
585 Periander is overthrown by Psammetichus
585 End of the First Sacred War
583 Psammetichus is overthrown by Korinth
582 Akragas is founded by Gelans
582: First recorded Pythian Games
581 Selinus attacks Motya
581 Korinth join the Peloponnesian League
580 Foundation of Parthenope
580 Selinus is defeated by Carthage and withdraws from Motya
580 Periander is overthrown by democrats in Ambrakia
580 Elis joins the Peloponnesian League
580 Lipari is founded by Knidosi
578 Thrasybulos dies
575 Empúries, also known as Ampurias (Greek: Ἐμπόριον, Catalan: Empúries [əmˈpuɾiəs], Spanish: Ampurias [amˈpuɾjas]), a town on the Mediterranean coast of the Catalan comarca of Alt Empordà in Catalonia, Spain is founded by Greek colonists from Phocaea with the name of Ἐμπόριον (Emporion, meaning "trading place", cf. emporion).
572 Pisa and Olympia are annexed by Elis
570 Akragas is overthrown by Phalaris
570 Phocaeans from Massalia (modern day Marseille) founded the colony of Monoikos (Monaco).
569 Pythagoras is born.
565 Peisistratos, Athenian general, organizes Diakrioi, party of poor people.
561 Peisistratos takes power in Athens for first time.
560 Ephesus is besieged by Lydia
560 Phalaris annexes Himera
559 Ephesus is annexed by Lydia
559-550 Lydia annexes Aeolis and Ionia
559 Achilleion is founded and annexed by Mytilene
557 Argos is overthrown by Perilaus
556 Phlius is overthrown by Leo
555 Helike (Elche) is established by Greeks from the Achaian city of Helice
555 Peisistratos driven out by Lycurgus who is commander of nobles.
555 Miltiades I unites Thracian Chernessos under his rule
554 Phalaris is overthrown by Akragas and Himera gains independence
553 Kamarina declares independence from Syracuse
552 Kamarina is annexed by Syracuse
551 Telemachus overthrows Akragas
550 Minoa is founded by Selinus
550 Odessa is established by the Greek city of Histria.
550 Miltiades II is born
549 Peisistratos restored by help of Megacles.
549 Boeotian League is founded
548 Lesbos sieges Sigeion
547 Athens repulses the Lesbans and Sigeion (Now ruled by Hegesistratos) becomes an Athenian vassal
546 Sparta annexes Kynouria, Thyrea and Kythera from Argos
546 Croesus, rich king of Lydia, captured at Sardis by Persians.
545 Miletus is overthrown by Molpagoras
545 Lygdamis becomes Tyrant of Naxos
545 The ancient Greek colony of Hermonassa (Krasnodar Krai, Russia) is founded by Ionians and Cretans.
544 Abdera starts its Golden Age
543 Phanagoria, (Krasnodar Krai, Russia), is founded by Teian colonists who had to flee Asia Minor in consequence of their conflict with Cyrus the Great.
542 Peisistratos expelled, makes fortune from Thracian mines.
542 The colony of Gorgippia (Krasnodar Krai, Russia) was built by Pontic Greeks.
541 Telemachus is overthrown by Alcamenes
540 Naxan vassalization of Paros
540 Selinus is overthrown by Theron
538 Sybaris conquers Siris
538 Samos is overthrown by Polycrates
536 Samos annexes South Mycale from Miletus
535 Perilaus dies
534 Athens starts extracting tribute from Ios
532 Croton is overthrown by Cylonius
532 Peisistratos restored by Thessaly and Lygdamis of Naxos.
531 Ikaria is annexed by Samos
530 Emporion becomes a Carthaginian vassal
530 Maktorion is founded by exiled Gelans
530 Tegea joins the Peloponnesian League
529 Leo dies
528 Maktorion is abandoned and the settlers move to Gela
527 Peisistratos dies, succeeded by sons Hippias and Hipparchus.
527 Rineia and Delos are annexed by Samos
526 Cylonius is overthrown by Kroton
525 Netum is annexed by Syracuse
525 The ancient Greek city of Euesperides, (modern day Benghazi) is founded by people from Cyrene
525 Persian Cambyses II, son of Cyrus the Great takes Egypt.
524 Samos annexes Donousa
524 Lgydamis of Naxos is overthrown
523 Chalcedon is annexed by Persian Empire
522 Death of Polycrates of Samos and succession of Maiandrios
521 Overthrow of Maiandros by Persian backed Syloson
520 Peithagoras overthrows Theron
519 Plataea leaves the Boeotian League and is sieged by the latter
519 Miltiades is overthrown by Stesagoras
519 Abydos declares independence from Stesagoras and is led by the Persian Tyrant Daphnis
518 Athens repulses the Boeotians from Plataea
517 Sybaris is overthrown by Telys
516 Miltiades II an Athenian Tyrant succeeds Stesagoras and reincorporates Abydos
516 Cassaibile is annexed by Syracuse
515 Molpagoras is succeeded by Histiaeos
515 Hippias becomes sole ruler after the death of Hipparchus.
514 Tenedos, Lesbos and Abydos is annexed by Persian Empire
513 Miltiades II defects from Athens to Persia
513 Myrcinos is founded by Ionians
513 Persia annexes Thrace (Region)
513 Cinyps, Libya, a failed Greek attempt to build a city under the leadership of Dorieus.
512 Antandrus is annexed by Persian Empire
512 Persian vassalization of Naxos
511 Piraeus is founded and annexed by Athens
511 Thracian Chernessos is annexed by Persian Empire
510 Kroton annexes Sybaris and overthrows Telys
510 Pythagoras establishes his own school.
510 Peithagoras is overthrown by Euryleon
510 Minoa is renamed Heraclea Minoa
510 Cinyps is annexed by Carthage
508 Andros and Naxos are annexed by Persian Empire
508 Hippias is forced to leave Athens.
507 Plataea is sieged by Boeotian League
507 Cleisthenes, Greek reformer, takes power, increases democracy.
506 Boeotian League is repulsed from Plataea by Athens
506 Cumae is overthrown by Aristodemus
506 Alcamenes is overthrown by Alcandros
506 The Levantine Plain is conquered by Athens and becomes a Cleurchy
505 Hegesistratos of Sigeion dies
505 Cleander overthrows Gela
504 Cleinias overthrows Croton
504 Taras defeats the Iapygians
503 Naxos declares independence from the Persian Empire
502 Euryleon is overthrown by Selinus
500 Pythagoras dies in Croton, Italy, when he was in Metapontum?
500 Heraclea Minoa is sacked by Carthage
500 Morgantina and Centuripe are hellenized and Licodia is founded by Leontini
499 Miletus Siege of Naxos (Naxan Victory)
499 Independence of Paros
499 Alcandros is overthrown by Akragas
499 Ionian Revolt starts
499 Éphesos, Klazomenai, Mílētos, Samos, Myus, Chios, Samos, Mytilene, Mylasa, Termera, Kyme and Priene declare independence from Persian Empire
498 Cyprus (Except Amathos), Caria, Paesos, Abydos, Cios, Percote, Lampsakos, Myrcinos, Tenedos, Dardanos, and Byzantium declare independence from Persian Empire
498 Amathos is sieged by Cyprus
498 Cleander is overthrown by Hippocrates
498 Hippocrates vassalized Leontini and puts Aenesidemus as tyrant
498 Licodia is annexed by Syracuse
497 Eion is sieged by Athens
497 Dardanos, Myrcinos, Abydos, Kyme, Klazomenai, Percote, Lampsakos, Cyprus, Cios and Paesos are reannexed by Persian Empire
497 Catania is vassalized by Hippocrates and Deinmenes is put in charge as tyrant
497 Persian Empire occupies all Carian land north of Pedasos (Carian)
496 Byzantium is overthrown by Histiaeos
496 Myrcinos is reannexed by the Persian Empire
496 Athenian Tyrant Miltiades II annexes Thracian Chernessos
496 Naxos is vassalized by Hippocrates
495 Cleinias dies
494 Rhegium is overthrown by Anaxilas
494 Zancle is vassalized by Hippocrates and Scythes put in charge
494 Priene, Samos and Miletus are annexed by Persian Empire
493 Byzantium sieges Thasus
493 Ionian revolt crushed
493 Zancle is settled by Samian refugees and renamed Messene
493 Zancle is conquered by Rhegion
492 Abdera and Thracian Chernessos are annexed by the Persian Empire
491 Hippocrates is overthrown by Gelon
491 Fort Scyllaeum is founded by Rhegion
490 Aristodemus dies
490 Persian conquest of Rhodes
490 Persian Siege of Naxos (Naxan Victory)
490 Persian conquest of Paros
490 Persian sacking of Eretria
490 Themistocles and Miltiades, Athenians, defeat Darius at Marathon, Phidippides runs with news.
490 Taras defeats the Iapygians in battle
488 Akragas is overthrown by Theron
486 Himera is overthrown by Terillus
485 Gelon annexes Syracuse (Except Kamarina and Licodia), Gela is given to Hieron
484 Kamarina is destroyed by Gelon
484 Aeschylus, Athenian playwright wins his first victory at the City Dionysia.
483 Megara Hyblaea and Licodia are destroyed by Gelon
483 Theron puts his son Thrasydaeus in charge of Himera as his vassal
481 Andros, Aegina and Akanthus among many other Greek Poleis declare allegiance to Persia
481 The Naxos, Milos, Sparta, Athens, Korinth, Kythnos and many other Greek Poleis form the Hellenic League to fight against the Persian Empire

Classical Greece (480–323 BC)
480 Aegina and Andros are impressed into the Hellenic League
480 Emporion ousts Carthaginian influences
480 Leonidas, Spartan, sacrifices 300 Spartan soldiers at the Battle of Thermopylae so main force can escape; Xerxes son of Darius is commanding the Persians.
480 Croton, Leucas and Corcyra joins the Hellenic League
480 Simultaneous with Thermopylae, the Greeks and Persians fight to a draw in the naval Battle of Artemisium.
480 Boeotia, Attica and Phocis are occupied by Persia
480 Battle of Salamis: Themistocles, Athenian general, lures Persians into Bay of Salamis, Xerxes loses and goes home, leaves behind Mardonius.
480 Possibly simultaneous with the Battle of Salamis, Battle of Himera between Carthage and Akragas (Theron)-Syracuse (Gelon)-Himera (Thrasydaeus)
479 Pausanias, Greek general routs Mardonius at the Battle of Plataea.
479 Battle of Mycale
479 Rhodes, Samos, Kos and many Greek cities in Persia begin to declare independence
479 Paros is vassalized by Athens
479 Athens annexes Tenedos
479 Sestos is besieged by Athens
479 Boeotian League is dissolved by Hellenic League
479 Sicel Ducetius overthrows Miniu
478 Byzantium is besieged by Athens
478 Delian League is founded by Athens and is soon joined by Ionia, Delos, Kos, Euboea, Tilos, Rhodes, Karpathos, Athenai, Paros, Troezen, Sifnos, Doris, Aeolis, Andros, Aenea, Akanthos, Samos, Chalcis, Eretria, Chios, Methymna, Chalkidiki, Mutilḗnē, Sigeion, Éphesos and many others
478 Gelon dies and is succeeded by Hieron, Polyzelos is put in control of Gela
477 The Persian Empire abandons Europe except Doriskus and Eion
477 Chalcedon, Byzantium, Carystus, Ainos, Perinthos and others join the Delian League
477 Andros is turned into an Athenian cleurchy
476 Micythus becomes Tyrant of Rhegion after Anaxilas' death
476 Catania is split between Hieron and Ducetius, Catania is renamed Aetna, settled by Dorians and ruled by the Tyrant Deinmenes II
476 Taras allies with Rhegion to protect themselves from the Iapygians, but later lose to them in battle
476 Himera is settled by Doric colonists
476 Sybaris declares independence from Kroton
476–462 Cimon elected general each year
475 Sybaris is annexed by Kroton
475 Abdera and Eion join the Delian League
475 Skyros is annexed by Athens
474 Battle of Cumae
474 Naxos joins the Delian League
474 Hieron occupies the Parthenopean Islands
474 Pindar, Greek poet relocates to Thebes (in Greece) from court at Syracuse.
473 Taras is defeated by the Iapygians
472 Thrasydaeus annexes Akragas after death of Theron
471 Naxos leaves the Delian League and is subsequently sieged by Athens
471 Themistocles ostracized.
470 Dénia, Hēmeroskopeion is founded by Massaliot Greeks. The town was situated on the cape then called Artemisium or Dianium, named from a temple of Ephesia Artemis built upon it (goddess Artemis was called Diana in Latin).
470 Naxos is impressed into the Delian League
470 Ducetius annexes Ergezio
470 The new urban zone of Neápolis was founded by citizens of the nearby Greek city of Cumae on the plain of Parthenope after the victorious Battle of Cumae
469 Illios is annexed by Mytilene
469 Klazomenai, Phaselis, Aspendos, Doris and Priene join the Delian League
468 Thrasydaeus is overthrown by Akragas
468 Sophocles, Greek playwright, defeats Aeschylus for Athenian Prize for drama.
467 Micythus steps down to Leophron
466 Taras is defeated by the Iapygians
466 Taras' monarchy is overthrown by democrats
466 Thrasybulos succeeds Hieron
465 Thasus leaves the Delian League and is sieged by Athens
465 Abydos and Troad join the Delian League
465 Thracian Chernessos is annexed by Athens
465 Deinmenes II, Aenesidemus, Thrasybulos and Polyzelos are overthrown by their respective cities
463 Thasus is impressed into the Delian League
462 Megara leaves the Peloponnesian League
461 Catania, Naxos and Catania declare independence from Syracuse, Dorian settlers are removed from Catania
461 Kamarina is refounded under the Tyranny of Psaumis
461 Cimon ostracized.
461 Thera joins the Peloponnesian League
461 Messene and Rhegion separate and oust Leophron
460 Taras defeats the Iapygians
460 Aetna is founded
460 First Peloponnesian War Starts
459 Aegina is besieged by Athens
459: Morgantina is annexed by Ducetius
459-455 Siege of Memphis, destruction of the Athenian fleet by Megabyzus
458 Imbros is annexed by Athens
457 Aegina is impressed into the Delian League
457 Delphi is annexed by Phocis
457 Pericles, Athenian statesman begins Golden Age, he was taught by Anaxagoras, who believed in dualistic Universe and atoms.
457 Boeotia (Except Thebes), Phocis and Locris join the Delian League
456 Gythium is raided by Athens
456 Zakynthos joins the Delian League
456 Castrugiuvanni (Enna) join Ducetius
456 Aeschylus dies.
455 Nafpaktos is impressed into the Delian League and settled with Messenian Helots
454 Abacaenum is annexed by Ducetius
454 Movement of Delian treasury to Athens and start of the First Athenian Empire
454 Athenian annexation of Delos
453 Palike is founded by Ducetius
452 Akragas and Aetna are annexed by Ducetius, Ducetius sieges Motyon
452 Nea Sybaris is founded by Sybarites
451 Athens besieges Kition
451 Motyon is occupied by Ducetius
450 Naxos becomes a cleurchy
450 Akragas and Motyon are liberated from Ducetius starting a decades long conflict between Syracuse+friends and the Sicels
449 Delphi declares independence from Phocis
449 Ducetius abandons the Sicel Federation he created and is forced to go into exile at Korinth
449 Morgantina is annexed Syracuse
449 Herodotus, Greek Historian, writes History of Greco-Persian War from 490 to 479.
448 Delphi is annexed by Phocis
447 Ictinus and Callicrates, Greek architects, begin construction of the Parthenon.
447 Nea Sybaris is annexed by Kroton
447 Chalcis leaves the Delian League and is besieged by Athens
446 Phocis, Locris and Boeotia leave the Delian League, Boeotia unites into the Boeotian League and joins the Peloponnesian League
446 Megara joins the Peloponnesian League
446 Kale Akte is founded by Ducetius
446 Achaea and Trozen leave the Peloponnesian League and join the Delian League
446-445 Euboean Revolt 
445 Euboea is impressed into the Delian League
445 Histiaea becomes an Athenian cleurchy
445 First Peloponnesian War Ends
445 Troezen is impressed into the Peloponnesian League
443 Thurii is founded by Sybarites and Various Hellenes
441 Euripides, Greek playwright, wins Athenian prize.
441 Sybaris on the Traeis is founded by Sybarites exiled from Thurii
440 Samos leaves the Delian League and is besieged by Athens
440 Palike is destroyed, ending the Sicel Federation
440 Ducetius dies
439 Samos is impressed into the Delian League
438 Founding of the Bosporan Kingdom
437 Newly founded Amphipolis annexes Eion
437 Athens allies with Messapia
436 Taulantii-Epidamos War
435 Phidias, Greek sculptor, completes statue of Zeus at Elis, 1 of 7 wonders of the world.
434 Epidamos becomes a democracy
434 Epidamos is annexed by Korinth
434 Kerkyra allies with Taulantii and besiege Epidamos
434 Kerkyra seizes Outer Epidamos (City)
434 Battle of Leukimme
434 Kerkyra raids Kyllene
434 Kerkyra joins Delian League
433 Battle of Sybota
433 Anactorium is annexed by Korinth
432 Psaumis dies
432 Potidaea leaves the Delian League and is sieged by Athens
432 Pydna is besieged by Athens
432 End of "Golden Age" of Athens
431 Sparta commanded by King Archidamus II prepares to destroy Athens thus starting the Peloponnesian War.
431 Plataea is besieged by Thebes
431 Pagae and Atalanta is occupied by Athens
431 Aegina is annexed by Athens
431 Empedocles, Greek doctor, believes body has Four Temperaments.
430 Athens abandons the Siege of Pydna
430 Herakleion is impressed into the Delian League
430 Spartan Siege of Zakynthos (Local Victory)
430 Failed peace mission by Athens, bubonic plague year, Sparta takes no prisoners.
430 Leucippus, Greek philosopher, believes every natural event has natural cause.  Athenian Plague begins in Athens.
429 Herakleion is annexed by Macedonia
429 Potidaea is impressed into the Delian League
429 All Chalkidiki cities (Except Mende, Acanthus, Scione, Stagirus and Aphytis) leave the Delian League
429 Athens Siege of Kydonia (Local Victory)
429 Phormio, Athenian admiral, wins the Battle of Chalcis/Rhium.
429 Pericles dies of Athenian Plague, possibly typhus or bubonic plague.
429 Hippocrates, Greek doctor, believes diseases have physical cause.
429 First Battle of Naupaktos (Athenian Victory)
428 Plato born.
428 Mytilene and Antissa leave the Delian league and Mytilene is sieged by Athens, Antissa is sieged by Methymna
428 Illios joins the Delian League
427 Suppression of Mytilene, Antissa is annexed by Methymna, Mytilene becomes an Athenian Cleurchy, Mytilene Troad joins the Delian League as independent cities
427 Archidamus II dies, Alcidas, Greek admiral sent to help Lesbos, raids Ionia and flees after seeing Athenian might.  Athenian Plague returns.
427 Plataea is impressed into the Boeotian League and by extension, the Peloponnesian League
427 Aristophanes, Greek playwright, wins Athenian Prize.
427 Corcyran Civil War (Democratic Victory)
427 First Athenian Intervention in Sicily begins
426 Megara occupies Pegae
426 Athens sieges Lecus
426 Pylos, Messene, Mylae, Aegitium and Tichium are occupied by Athens, Pylos is founded by escaped Helots
426 Battle of Tanagra
426 Amfissa joins the Peloponnesian League
426 Ozolian Locris join the Delian League
426 Demosthenes, Athenian general, and Cleon, Athenian demagogue, revitalizes Athenian forces, makes bold plans opposed by Nicias, his first military campaign barely succeeds.
426 Ambrakia occupies Olpae and Argos
426 Acarnanian League and Amphilochian League are founded and join the Delian League
425 Acarnania occupies Olpae and Argos
425 Athenian fleet bottles up Spartan navy at Navarino Bay, Nicias resigns.
425 Herakleion is impressed into the Delian League
425 Athens occupies Sphacteria
425 Morgantina is annexed by Kamarina
425 Ozolian Locris joins the Peloponnesian League
425 Athens withdraws from Lecas and Acarnania
425 Athens withdraws from Messene and Mylae is impressed into the Delian League
424 Herakleion is annexed by Makedonia
424 Eion, Akanthus and Amphipolis are besieged by Sparta
424 Stagira joins the Peloponnesian League
424 Nisaia, and Siphae are occupied by Athenai
424 Thyrea is occupied by Athens
424 First Athenian Intervention in Sicily ends
424 Pagondas of Thebes (in Greece) crushes Athenian army at the Battle of Delium, Brasidas a Spartan general, has a successful campaign in the Chalcidice, Cleon exiles Thucydides for 20 years for arriving late.
423 Sparta occupied Amphipolis and Scione
423 Torone is occupied by Makedonia
423 Akanthus joins the Peloponnesian League
423 Truce of Laches supposed to stop Brasidas but doesn't, Nicias commands Athenian forces in retaking Mende.
423 Olynthus form the Chalcidian League independent of the Delian League
422 Stagira is besieged by Athens
422 Neapolis is annexed by Rome
422 Torone and Scione are impressed into the Delian League
422 Cleon meets Brasidas outside of Amphipolis, both are killed (Battle of Amphipolis).
422 Syracuse annexes the now weak Leontini
421 Peace of Nicias brings temporary end to war, but Alcibiades, a nephew of Pericles, makes anti-Sparta alliance.
421 Herakleion is impressed into the Delian League
421 Cumae is annexed by Oscans
421 Athens abandons the Siege of Stagira
421 Delphi declares independence from Phocis
421 Argulus, Apollonia, Potidaea, Akanthus, Stageira and others join the Chalcidian League
420 Mantineia, Argos, Elis, Sicyon and Achaea betray Sparta and switch to the Delian League
419 Athens occupies Epidauros
419 King Agis II of Sparta attacks Argos, makes treaty.
418 Battle of Mantinea, greatest land battle of war, gives Sparta victory over Argos, which violated treaty, Alcibiades thrown out, alliance ended.
418 Orchmenos is occupied by Argos
417 Orchmenos is given to Boeotia
417 Sicyon joins the Peloponnesian League
417 Epidauros is occupied by Sparta
416 Melos is besieged by Athens
416 Alcibiades makes plans, is restored to power.
416 Selinus annexes Segesta's frontier provinces
416 Massacre of the Melians.
415 Hermai statues are mutilated in Athens, Alcibiades accused, asks for inquiry, told to set sail for battle (Sicilian Expedition), is condemned to death in absentia, he defects to Sparta.
415 Many Syracusan cities rebel
415-413 Siege of Syracuse
414-413 Metapontion allies with Athens
414 Lamachus, Athenian commander killed at Syracuse.
413 Nicias and Demosthenes killed at Syracuse
413 Leontini and Kamarina are vassalized by Syracuse
413 Herakleion is annexed by Makedonia
413 Miletus and Khios betray Athens and join the Peloponnesian League
412 Alcibiades is expelled from Sparta, conspires to come back to Athens.
412 Methymna is occupied by Sparta
412 Klazomenai and Kyzikus betray Athens and join the Peloponnesian League
412 Chios is sieged by Athens
412 Aygrion dies and is succeeded by Aygris
411 Sparta allies with Persia
411 Aspendos is annexed by Persia
411 Kyzikus and Klazomenai are impressed into the Delian League
411 Oropos is occupied by Boeotia
411 Illios is annexes by Lampsacus
411 Athens abandons the Siege of Chios
411 Sparta leaves Methymna
411 Euboea, Byzantium, Abydos, Andros, Antandrus, Lampsacus, Chalcedon and Rodos betray Athens and join the Peloponnesian League
411 Abydos is overthrown by Dercylidas
411 Selinus attacks Segesta once again and aggravates Carthage
411 Athens is overthrown by the Four Hundred
410 After several successes, Athenian demagogue Cleophon rejects Spartan peace offers.
410 Segesta is annexed by Carthage
410 Four Hundred are overthrown by Athens
409 Antandrus is annexed by Persia
409 Abydos is besieged by Athens
409 Sparta sieges Klazomenai
409 Selinus and Himera are sacked by Carthage
409 Byzantium recaptured by Alcibiades for Athens.
408 The 3 poleis of Rodos unite and build a new capital called Rodos
408 Athens besieges Paleopoli
408 Athens abandons Siege of Abydos
408 Sparta abandons the Siege of Klazomenai
408 Alcibiades reenters Athens in triumph, Lysander, a Spartan commander, has fleet built at Ephesus.
407 Thermae is founded by Carthage
407 Athens abandons the Siege of Paleopoli
407 Lysander begins destruction of Athenian fleet, Alcibiades stripped of power.
406 Sparta sieges Methymna
406 Akragas is sacked by Carthage
406 Callicratides, Spartan naval commander, loses Battle of Arginusae over blockade of Mitylene harbor, Sparta sues for peace, rejected by Cleophon.
405 Methymna is impressed into the Peloponnesian League
405 Syracuse is overthrown by Dionysius the Elder
405 Melos is annexed by Sparta
405 Gela, Kamarina and Akrillai is sacked by Carthage
405 Carthage allow the people of the sacked cities to return as Carthaginian subjects and rebuild their cities
405 Leontini and Morgantina declare independence from Syracuse
405 Carthage annexes Elymi, Sicel and Sican territory
405 The naval Battle of Aegospotami in which Lysander captures the Athenian fleet, Spartan king Pausanias besieges Athens, Cleophon executed, Corinth and Thebes demand destruction of Athens.
405 Klazomenai and Ephesus betray Athens and join the Peloponnesian League. All Carthaginian subjects (Except Ziz, their islands, Motya, Solus, Elymi, Segesta, and Entella) gain independence
404 Athens capitulates April 25. Theramenes secures terms, prevents total destruction of Athens, Theramenes and Alcibiades are killed.
404 Delian League is dissolved
404 Korinth leaves the Peloponnesian League
404 Entella is overthrown by mercenaries loyal to Carthage
404 Aygris becomes a Syracusan Subject
404 Nafpaktos is annexed by Ozolian Locris
404 Athens is overthrown by the Thirty
404 Athens joins the Peloponnesian League
403 Aeimnestus, who is loyal to Dionysius, overthrows Castrugiuvanni
403 Aetna is overthrown by mercenaries loyal to Dionysius
403 Dionysius destroys Naxos and Catania and Sicels split Naxos with Syracuse, Catania is ruled by Campanian mercenaries loyal to Dionysius
403 Athens overthrows the Thirty
403 Athens leaves the Peloponnesian League and refounds the Delian League
402 Elis leaves the Peloponnesian League and is subsequently sieged by Sparta
401 Euboea joins the Delian League
401 Elis is sacked and impressed into the Peloponnesian League
401 Dionysius free Castrugiuvanni from Aeimnestus
401 Poseidonia is annexed by Lucanians
401 Thucydides, Greek historian, leaves account of "Golden Age of Pericles" and Peloponnesian War at his death (History of the Peloponnesian War).
400 Adranon is founded by Dionysius
400 Aygris annexes Centuripe
400 Democritus, Greek philosopher, develops Atomic theory, believes cause and necessity, nothing comes out of nothing
399 Illios declares independence from Lampsacus
399 Sparta sways Persian Controlled Greek cities near Pergamon to their side and march on Egyptian Larissa and siege it
399 Socrates, Greek philosopher, condemned to death for corrupting youth.
398 Ionia joins the Peloponnesian League
398 All Carthaginian subjects (Except Ziz, their islands, Motya, Solus, Elymi, Segesta, and Entella) gain independence from Carthage
398 Dionysius sieges Segesta and Entella
398 Mainland territory of Motya is occupied by Dionysius
397 Motya is destroyed by Dionysius and the Carthaginians build Lilybaion to replace it
397 Dionysius abandons the Sieges of Entella and Segesta
397 Eryx, Segesta, Lipari, Messene and Entella are annexed by Carthage
397 Carthage allies with the Sicel cities except Assorus
397 Tauormenion is founded by Carthage to be a supply base, settled by Sicels
397 Carthaginian forces have to go the long way around Mount Etna due to an eruption
397 Catania is occupied by Carthage
397 Battle of Catania
397 Syracuse is besieged by Carthage
396 Carthage lifts the Siege of Syracuse and abandons Eastern Sicily except Messene and Lipari
396 Himera and Selinus are annexed by Carthage
396 Gela, Ergezio, Catania, Adranon, Kamarina and Leontini are annexed by Dionysius
396 Tyndaris is founded by Dionysius to combat piracy and a base of operations
396 Persia annexes Rodos
396 Sparta campaigns in Phrygia
395 Sparta campaigns in Ionia, Caria and march up to Sardis
395 Orchmenus leaves the Boeotian League
395 Cephaloedium is annexed by Dionysius
395 Mylae is annexed by Rhegion
395 Argos, Korinthos and Boeotian League leave the Peloponnesian League
394 Sparta withdraws from Anatolia
394 All Thracian and Anatolian Greek cities leave the Peloponnesian League (Except Sestos and Abydos)
394 Virtually all Greek Anatolian cities are annexed by Persia
394 Klazomenaites relocate to an island off shore
394 Mylae is annexed by Syracuse
393 Lipari is annexed by Syracuse
393 Italiote League is formed by Sybaris on the Traeis, Croton, Caulonia, Thurii, Rhegium and Velia
393 Imbros, Lemnos and Skyros are annexed by Athens
393 Makedonia starts paying tribute to the newly formed Kingdom of Dardania
393 Chalcidian League annexes some Makedonian land
392 Sparta occupies Lechaeum
392 Heraclea Minoa, Akragas and Sicani territory are annexed by Carthage
392 Sicel territory is annexed by Dionysius
392 Makedonia stops paying tribute to Dardania
392 Makedonia reannexes the land taken by the Chalcidian League
392 Damastion is annexed by Dardania
391 Korinth occupies Phlius
391 Tauromenion is overthrown by mercenaries loyal to Dionysius
391 Makedonia starts pays tribute to Dardania
390 The Acarnanian League joins the Peloponnesian League
390 Dercylidas is succeeded by Anaxibios
390 Himera is merged into Thermae
390 Dionysius transfers control of Mylae to Messene
390 Kroton is annexed by Syracuse
390 Argos and Korinth unite into Argos-Korinth
390 Castrugiuvani is annexed by Syracuse
389 Metapontion is annexed by Syracuse
389 Anaxibios is overthrown by Abydos
387 Rhegion is annexed by Syracuse and renamed it to Phoebea
387 Peace of Antalcidas concluded between the Greeks and the Persians that leads to virtually all Greek cities in Asia Minor being annexed by Persia
387 Ancona is founded by Greek settlers from Syracuse, who gave it its name: Ancona stems from the Greek word Ἀγκών (Ankòn), meaning "elbow"
387 Argos and Korinth split
387 All cities gain independence and all league except the Peloponnesian League are disbanded
386 Phlius becomes a democracy
385 Dardania attacks Molossia
385 The Greeks colonized the island of Pharos (Hvar, Croatia).
384 Dionysius occupies Pyrgi and Caere
384 Chalcidian League annexes Makedonia land including Pella
383 Gela gains independence from Syracuse
383 Dionysius leaves Eturia
383 Liburnia besieges Pharos
383 Potidaea leaves the Chalcidian League
382 Thebes is overthrown by Leontiades and Archias
382 Thebes is impressed into the Peloponnesian League
380 Sparta besieges Phlius
380 Makedonia recaptures their former territory
379 Kroton is annexed by Dionysius
379 Phlius is impressed into the Peloponnesian League
379 The Chalcidian League is disbanded and its former members are impressed into the Peloponnesian League and Potidaea and Korinth also join the league
379 Leontiades and Archias are overthrown and Thebes leaves the Peloponnesian League
379 Sparta occupies Thespiae
378 Themison overthrows Eretria
377 The Boeotian League is refounded by Thebes
376 Abdera is sacked by the Triballi and Maroneia
376 Thespiae and the rest of Boeotia are liberated and join the Boeotian League
375 The Acarnanian League defects from the Peloponnesian League and joins the Delian League
375 Chalcidian League is reestablished by Olynthus and joins the Delian League
373 Kerkyra is besieged by Sparta
371 Sparta leaves Kerkyra
370 Gythium is occupied by Thebes
370 Heraclea Sintica is founded by Makedonia
369 Korinth is overthrown by Timophanes
368 Aetolian League is founded
367 Daparria is annexed by Dardania
367 Kroton is annexed by Bruttian League
366 Opus declares independence from Athens with the help of Themison
365 Opus requests Thebes to protect them from Athens and sends a garrison. Opus is impressed into the Boeotian League
364 Timophanes is assassinated
364 Orchmenus leaves the Boeotian League and is subsequently sieged by Thebes
363 Orchmenus is impressed into the Boeotian League
363 Pydna is impressed into the Delian League
362 Themison dies and is succeeded by Plutarch
361 Potidaea and Torone are impressed into the Delian League and become Athenian Cluerchies
360 Tauromenion overthrows the mercenaries and falls under the tyranny of Andromache
360 Illios is overthrown by Charidemos
360 Abydos is overthrown by Iphiades
359 Charidemos is overthrown by Illios
359 Dardania annexes Lake Ohrid and Upper Macedonia
359 Archelaus annexes Methone, Aegae and Pydna
358 Archelaus is annexed by Makedonia
358 Macedonia reannexes Lake Ohrid, Lynkestis and Upper Macedonia from Dardania
358 Makedonia annexes Paeonia
357 Social War Starts
357 Kos, Khios, Rodos and Byzantium leave the Delian League
357 Makedonia annexes Pydna and Amphipolis
357 Dionysius II is overthrown by Dion
356 Phocis annexes Delphi
356 Locris is annexed by Dionysius II
356 Lemnos, Samos and Imbros is occupied by Chios and leave the Delian League
356 Makedonia annexes Crenides, renames it Philippi and settles it with Makedonians
356 Makedonian border set on Nestus river
356 Potidaea and Anthemus are annexed by Chalcidian League
356 Makedonia besieges Methone
356 Lokros is overthrown by Dionysius II
355 Social War Ends
355 Argolas is besieged by Phocis
355 Dion is overthrown by Callipus
354 Methone and Abdera are annexed by Makedonia
354 Phocis abandons the Siege of Argolas
354 Thessaly is vassalized by Phocis
353 Catania is annexed by Callipus
353 Makedonia occupied Pagasae
353 Thessaly is vassalized by Makedonia
352 Callipus is overthrown by Hipparinos (Callipus keeps Catania)
352 Nicodemus overthrows Centuripe
352 Orchmenus and Chaeronea are occupied by Phocis
351 Rhegion is annexed by Callipus
350 Akanthos is annexed by Makedonia
350 Nice (Nicaea) is founded by the Greeks of Massalia (Marseille), and was given the name of Nikaia (Νίκαια) in honour of a victory over the neighbouring Ligurians; Nike (Νίκη) was the Greek goddess of victory.
350 Hipparinos is overthrown by Aretaeus
350 Mamercus ousts Callippus from Catania
349 Plutarch is expelled from Eretria
349 Aretaeus is overthrown by Nysaios
348 Stagira is annexed by Makedonia
348 Callipus is overthrown by Leptines
347 Leontini is overthrown by Hicetas 
347 Plato, Greek philosopher, founder of Academy, dies.
347 Methymna is overthrown by Kleommis
346 Phocis withdraws from Boeotia
346 Dionysius II leaves Locris and overthrows Nysaios
346 Lyttos is besieged by Knossos
346 Makedonia occupies Thermopylae and Antikyra, Nicaea is occupied by Thessaly
345 Makedonia withdraws from Thermopylae and Antikyra
345 Grabaei becomes a vassal of Macedonia
345 Hicetas sieges Syracuse and seizes Syracuse's territory
345 The Pro-Makedonian Tyrant Hipparchus overthrows Eretria
345 Mainland Syracuse (City) is occupied by Hicetas leaving only the citadel in Dionysius' control
344 Macedonia occupies Illios and annexes Tenedos
344 Siege of Lyttos lifted by Knossos
344 Knossos besieges Kydonia
344 Hicetas is repulsed by Timoleon from Syracuse
344 Timoleon takes control of all Syracusan forces outside the citadel
343 Messene is rebuilt by Timoelon, Adranon is freed from mercenary control, Nicodemus is overthrown by Centuripe with help of Timoleon
343 Timoleon annexes the citadel
343 Siege of Kydonia is lifted by Knossos
342 Rhegion is freed by Timoleon
342 Aristotle, Greek philosopher, begins teaching Alexander, son of Philip of Macedon.
341 Hipparchus is overthrown by Athenian forces and impressed into the Delian league
341 Samothrace is annexed by Makedonia
340 Antipolis (modern day Antibes) is founded by Phocaean Greeks from Massilia.
340 Skyros is annexed by Makedonia
340 Entella is freed by Timoleon
339 Elateia is occupied by Makedonia
339 Agyris and Aetna are freed by Timoleon
339 Nicaea is occupied by Boeotia
338 Amphissa is annexed by Delphi
338 Thyrea is annexed by Argos
338 Mamercus dies
338 Cumae is annexed by Rome
338 Leontini is freed by Timoleon
338 Nafpaktos joins the Aetolian League
338 King Philip II of Macedon defeats Athens and Thebes at Battle of Chaeronea August 2 and establishes League of Corinth during winter of 338 BC/337 BC.
337 Amfissa declares independence from Delphi
336 Timoleon dies
336 Lesbos is annexed by Makedonia
336 Alexander succeeds father Philip II, who was assassinated by Pausanias of Orestis.
334 Andromache dies and his city is annexed by Syracuse
334 Battle of the Granicus
333 Saminum is occupied by Epirus
333 Alexander defeats Persians at Battle of Issus, but Darius III escapes.
332 Epirus occupies Heraclea, Metapontium, Southern Lucania, Daunia, Paestum, Terina and Sipontum
332 Siege of Tyre
332 Siege of Gaza
332 Alexander conquers Egypt.
332 Alexandria is founded by Alexander the Great
331 Epirus occupies Cosentia
331 Battle of Pandosia
331 Gerasa (Jordan) is founded by Makedonian veterans
331 at Battle of Gaugamela October 1, Alexander ends Achaemenid Dynasty and conquers Persian Empire.
331 Alexander the Great enters in Babylon
331 Tauromenion is freed by Carthage
331 Battle of the Uxian Defile (East of Susa, Iran)
330 Sparta joins the League of Corinth
330 Battle of the Persian Gate, destruction of Persepolis (modern Iran)
330-325 Pytheas makes the earliest Greek voyage to Great Britain and the Arctic Circle for which there is a record.
329 Siege of Cyropolis
329 Battle of Jaxartes
329 Alexander conquers Samarkand, Uzbekistan
329 Alexander the Great founds Alexandria Eschate in modern Tajikistan
329-160 Dayuan Kingdom.
328 Sybaris on the Traeis is annexed by Bruttian League
327 Oenidae is impressed into the Aetolian League
327 Under the command of Alexander the Great the forces of the Hellenic League captures the fortress of the Sogdian Rock. Sogdiana and the Kabul region came under Hellenic control 
327 Alexander invades northern India, but his army is despondent and refuses to march further eastwards.
326 Battle of the Hydaspes
326 Samos joins the Delian League
326 Alexandria Bucephalous (located on the Hydaspes river, Pakistan) is founded by Alexander the Great in memory of his beloved horse Bucephalus
325 Nearchus serving under Alexander the Great discovers Tylos (the name used by the Greeks to refer to Bahrain).
324 Kroton is overthrown by Menedemus
324 Charax Spasinu, one of Alexander's last cities before his death, is established at the head of the Persian Gulf (modern Iran) replacing a small Persian settlement, Durine.

Hellenistic Greece (323–146 BC)
323 King Alexander dies, his generals vie for power in Wars of the Diadochi
322–320  First War of the Diadochi.
320 Partition of Triparadisus.
320–311  Second War of the Diadochi.
316 Menander, Greek playwright, wins Athenian prize.
312–63 Seleucid Empire.
310 Zeno of Citium founds his stoic school in Athens.
310 Battle of White Tunis (near modern Tunis, Tunisia)
307 Epicurus founds his philosophic school in Athens.
305–30 Ptolemaic Kingdom.
301 Battle of Ipsus.
300 Antioch, is founded by Seleucus I Nicator in honor of his father Antiochus
300 Euclid, Greek mathematician, publishes Elements, treating both geometry and number theory (see also Euclidean algorithm).
295 Athens falls to Demetrius, Lachares killed.
282–133 Kingdom of Pergamon.
281  Creation of the Achaean League.
280 The Greek colony of Aspálathos (Aσπάλαθος) is founded (modern day Split).
280–275 Pyrrhic War.
279 Gallic invasion of the Balkans.
274–271 First Syrian War.
267–262 Chremonidean War.
265 Archimedes, Greek mathematician, develops Archimedes' screw, specific gravity, center of gravity; anticipates discoveries of integral calculus.
260–253 Second Syrian War.
256–125 Greco-Bactrian Kingdom.
246–241 Third Syrian War.
235 Tanais (Rostov-on-Don, Russia) is founded by merchant adventurers from Miletus
220 Euthydemus I of the Greco-Bactrians led expeditions as far as Kashgar and Ürümqi in Xinjiang, leading to the first known contacts between China and the West.
219–217 Fourth Syrian War.
214–205 First Macedonian War.
203–200 Fifth Syrian War.
200–196 Second Macedonian War.
192–188 Roman–Syrian War.
180–10 AD Indo-Greek Kingdom.
172–167 Third Macedonian War.
170–168 Sixth Syrian War.
155 BC Attack of the Indo-Greeks on Pataliputra, a magnificent fortified city with 570 towers and 64 gates according to Megasthenes, who describes the ultimate destruction of the city's walls.
150 BC King Attalus II of Pergamon founds the city of Attaleia or Antalya in his honour.
150–148 Fourth Macedonian War.
146–146 Battle of Corinth

See also
 Timeline of Athens

References

Ancient timelines
Ancient Greece
Ancient Greece-related lists